Blondie in Society is a 1941 black-and-white comedy film directed by Frank R. Strayer and starring Penny Singleton, Arthur Lake, and Larry Simms. It is the ninth of the 28 features in the Blondie film series.

Plot
Dagwood is given a Great Dane in lieu of repayment for a personal loan he made to an old buddy.  The dog, named "Chin-Up," has a voracious appetite, incurs veterinary bills, and roams around stealing food from several neighbors, causing them to sign a petition to evict the Bumsteads.  Blondie is sad that she now cannot afford a hair permanent, buy their first washing machine, or their son a bicycle.  Different people involved disagree on whether Chin-Up is valuable or worthless.  Despite Chin-Up's undisciplined nature, Blondie finally enters him in a major dog contest, where he wins a $500 prize, although there is confusion whether the dog's rightful owner is the Bumsteads, Mr. Dithers, a kennel owner, or a building client (William Frawley) who Chin-Up had been promised to.  Blondie along with a boy scout choir at the dog show, sings the inspirational song Trees.

Cast

References

External links
 
 
 
 

1941 films
Columbia Pictures films
American black-and-white films
1941 comedy films
Films directed by Frank R. Strayer
Blondie (film series) films
1940s English-language films
1940s American films